The Malawi national football team, nicknamed The Flames, represents Malawi in international football and is controlled by the Football Association of Malawi. Before 1966, they were known as the Nyasaland national football team.

They have qualified for three Africa Cup of Nations, in 1984, 2010 and 2021. They also won the CECAFA Cup in 1978, 1979 and 1988.

History
Malawi first qualified for an African Cup of Nations in 1984, when only eight teams competed in the tournament in Ivory Coast. After a 3-0 defeat against Algeria, World Cup participants in 1982 and 1986, the Malawi drew 2-2 in the second game against eventual finalists Nigeria. With a 0–1 loss against Ghana, Malawi ended the group stage with 1 point at the bottom of the table and was eliminated from the tournament.

After 26 years, Malawi took part in an Africa Cup of Nations again in 2010. The team benefited from the fact that the continental elimination round for the 2010 FIFA World Cup also served as the qualifying round for AFCON. In the group matches of the third round, Malawi, third place behind Côte d'Ivoire and Burkina Faso and with a record of only four points and 4–11 goal difference, was enough to make it to the continental finals.

At the tournament in Angola, Kinnah Phiri's team caused a big surprise. In the first group game, Malawi defeated Algeria, which had qualified for the World Cup, 3-0. One of the goalscorers was striker Russel Mwafulirwa, who at the time was under contract for the Swedish first division club IFK Norrköping and was thus one of only two players in the 23-man squad active in Europe. Malawi lost the second game against hosts Angola, 2-0.

For Malawi to have reached the quarter-finals for the first time, a draw in the last group game would have been enough. However, the team lost 3-1 to Mali. After just three minutes, the Malawians were 2-0 down, a goal from Mwafulirwa did nothing to avert the team's elimination.

Recent results and forthcoming fixtures

Matches in last 12 months, as well as any future scheduled matches.

2022

2023

Coaching staff

Coaching history
Caretaker coaches are listed in italics

 Jack Chamangwana (1998–99)
 Young Chimodzi (1999–00)
 Kim Splidsboel (2000–02)
 Alan Gillett (2003)
 Edington Ng'onamo (2003–04)
 John Kaputa (2004)
 Yassin Osman (2004–05)
 Michael Hennigan (2005)
 Burkhard Ziese (2005–06)
 Kinnah Phiri (2006–07)
 Stephen Constantine (2007–08)
 Kinnah Phiri (2009–12)
 Edington Ng'onamo (2012–13)
 Tom Saintfiet (2013)
 Young Chimodzi (2014–15)
 Ernest Mtawali (2015–16)
 Ramadhan Nsanzurwimo (2016–17)
 Gerald Phiri Sr. (2017)
 Ronny Van Geneugden (2017–19)
 Meke Mwase (2019–2021)
 Mario Marinică (2021–2022)

Current squad
The following players were called up for the 2023 AFCON qualification matches against Egypt on 24 and 28 March 2023.

Caps and goals correct as of: 25 February 2023, after the match against

Recent call-ups
The following players have been called up for the team in the last 12 months.

Records

Players in bold are still active with Malawi.

Most appearances

Top goalscorers

Competition records

FIFA World Cup

Africa Cup of Nations

African Games
Football at the African Games has been an under-23 tournament since 1991.

Gossage Cup / CECAFA Cup

COSAFA Cup

Head-to-head record
As of 17 November 2019 after match against

Honours
COSAFA Cup :
2 Times Runners-up (2002, 2003)
1 Time Plate Winners (2015)
CECAFA Cup :
3 Times Winners (1978, 1979, 1988)
3 Times Runners-up
All Africa Games :
1 Third Place (1987)

References

External links

 
Malawi at FIFA.com

 
African national association football teams